The Nerl is a river in Pereslavsky District of Yaroslavl and Kalyazinsky District of Tver Oblast in Russia, a right tributary of the Volga (at the Uglich Reservoir). Its main tributary is the Kubr (left).

It originates in the Lake Pleshcheyevo under the name of Veksa-Pleshcheyevskaya, flows northwest and is known as the Nerl downstream of Lake Somino. Downstream of the village of Andrianovo a stretch of the Nerl makes the border between Yaroslavl and Tver Oblasts. Further downstream, the Nerl enters Tver Oblast. Its mouth is in the village of Sknyatino.

The drainage basin of the Nerl includes the western and the central parts of Pereslavsky District, the southern part of Kalyazinsky District, as well as relatively minor areas in the southern part of Uglichsky District of Yaroslavl Oblast, and northern parts of Alexandrovsky District of Vladimir Oblast and Taldomsky and Sergiyevo-Posadsky Districts of Moscow Oblast. The town of Pereslavl-Zalessky and the urban-type settlement of Kubrinsk lie in the drainage basin of the Nerl.

References

Rivers of Tver Oblast
Rivers of Yaroslavl Oblast